is a Japanese baseball pitcher for the Hiroshima Toyo Carp of Nippon Professional Baseball.

Nakamura attended , and was selected by the Hiroshima Toyo Carp in the 2013 Nippon Professional Baseball draft as the team's fifth pick. He pitched in the Western League for three full seasons until making his NBP debut with the Carp in 2017. Since his first-team debut in 2017, Nakamura has split time between the Central League's Carp and the Western League's Carp.

References

Baseball people from Tokyo
Hiroshima Toyo Carp players
1995 births
Living people
Nippon Professional Baseball pitchers
People from Edogawa, Tokyo